A dictation machine is a sound recording device most commonly used to record speech for playback or to be typed into print. It includes digital voice recorders and tape recorder.

The name "Dictaphone" is a trademark of the company of the same name, but it has also become a common term for all dictation machines, as a genericized trademark.

History 

Alexander Graham Bell and his two associates took Edison's tinfoil phonograph and modified it considerably to make it reproduce sound from wax instead of tinfoil. They began their work at Bell's Volta Laboratory in Washington, D.C.In 1879, and continued until they were granted basic patents in 1886 for recording in wax.

Thomas A. Edison had invented the phonograph in 1877, but the fame bestowed on him for this invention — sometimes called his most original — was not due to its efficiency. Recording with his tinfoil phonograph was too difficult to be practical, as the tinfoil tore easily, and even when the stylus was properly adjusted. Although Edison had hit upon the secret of sound recording, immediately after his discovery he did not improve it, allegedly because of an agreement to spend the next five years developing the New York City electric light and power systems.

By 1881 the Volta associates had success in improving an Edison tinfoil machine to some extent. Wax was put in the grooves of the heavy iron cylinder, and no tinfoil was used. The basic distinction between the Edison's first phonograph patent, and the Bell and [Charles Sumner] Tainter patent of 1886 was the method of recording. Edison's method was to indent the sound waves on a piece of tinfoil, while Bell and Tainter's invention called for cutting, or 'engraving', the sound waves into a wax record with a sharp recording stylus. 

Among the later improvements by the Volta Associates, the Graphophone used a cutting stylus to create lateral zig-zag grooves of uniform depth into the wax-coated cardboard cylinders, rather than the up-down vertically-cut grooves of Edison's contemporary phonograph machine designs. 

Notably, Bell and Tainter developed wax-coated cardboard cylinders for their record cylinders, instead of Edison's cast iron cylinder, covered with a removable film of tinfoil (the actual recording medium, which was prone to damage during installation or removable. Tainter received a separate patent for a tube assembly machine to automatically produce the coiled cardboard tubes, which served as the foundation for the wax cylinder records.

Besides being far easier to handle, the wax recording medium also allowed for lengthier recordings and created superior playback quality.  Additionally the Graphophones initially deployed foot treadles to rotate the recordings, then wind-up clockwork drive mechanisms, and finally migrated to electric motors, instead of the manual crank that was used on Edison's phonograph.  The numerous improvements allowed for a sound quality that was significantly better than Edison's machine.

Shortly after Thomas Edison invented the phonograph, the first device for recording sound, in 1877, he thought that the main use for the new device would be for recording speech in business settings. (Given the low audio frequency of earliest versions of the phonograph, recording music may not have seemed to be a major application.)  Some early phonograph were indeed used this way, but this did not become common until the production of reusable wax cylinders in the late 1880s. The differentiation of office dictation devices from other early phonographs, which commonly had attachments for making one's own recordings, was gradual. The machine marketed by the Edison Records company was trademarked as the "Ediphone". 

Following the invention of the audion tube in 1906, electric microphones gradually replaced the purely acoustical recording methods of earlier dictaphones by the late 1930s. In 1945, the SoundScriber, Gray Audograph and Edison Voicewriter, which cut grooves into a plastic disc, was introduced, and two years later Dictaphone replaced wax cylinders with their Dictabelt technology, which cut a mechanical groove into a plastic belt instead of into a wax cylinder. This was later replaced by magnetic tape recording. While reel-to-reel tape was used for dictation, the inconvenience of threading tape spools led to development of more convenient formats, notably the Compact Cassette, Mini-Cassette, and Microcassette.

Digital dictation
Digital dictation became possible in the 1990s, as falling computer memory prices made possible pocket-sized digital voice recorders that stored sound on computer memory chips without moving parts. Many early 21st-century digital cameras and smartphones have this capability built in. In the 1990s, improvements in voice recognition technology began to allow computers to transcribe recorded audio dictation into text form, a task that previously required human secretaries or transcribers.

The files generated with digital recorders vary in size, depending on the manufacturer and the format the user chooses. The most common file formats that digital recorders generate have one of the extensions WAV, WMA and MP3. Many dictation machines record in the DSS and DS2 format. Dictation audio can be recorded in various audio file formats. Most digital dictation systems use a lossy form of audio compression based on modelling of the vocal tract to minimize hard disk space and optimize network utilization as files are transferred between users. (Note that WAV is not an audio encoding format, but a file format and has little or no bearing on the encoding rate (kbit/s), size or audio quality of the resulting file.)

Digital dictation offers several advantages over traditional cassette tape based dictation:
 The user can instantly rewind or fast forward to any point within the dictation file to review or edit.
 The random access ability of digital audio allows inserting audio at any point without overwriting the following text.
 Dictation produces a file which can be transferred electronically, e.g. via WAN, LAN, USB, e-mail, telephony, FTP, etc.
 Large dictation files can be shared with multiple typists.
 Sound may be CD quality and can improve transcription accuracy and speed.
 Digital dictation provides the ability to report on the volume or type of dictation and transcription outstanding or completed within an organization.

Despite the advances in technology, analog media are still widely used in dictation recording due to its flexibility, permanence, and robustness. In some cases, speech is recorded where sound quality is paramount and transcription unnecessary, e.g. for broadcasting a theatre play; recording techniques closer to high-fidelity music recording are more appropriate.

Methods
Portable recorder
Portable, hand held, digital recorders are the modern replacement for along with handhelds. Digital portables allow transfer of recordings by docking or plugging into a computer. Digital recorders eliminate the need for cassette tapes.  Professional digital hand held recorders are available with slide switch, push button, fingerprint locking, and barcode scanning options.

Computer
Another common way to record digital dictation is with a computer dictation microphone. There are several different types of computer dictation microphones available, but each one has similar features and operation.Olympus Direct Rec, Philips SpeechMike, and Dictaphone Powermic are all digital computer dictation microphones that also feature push button control for operating dictation or speech recognition software. The dictation microphone operates through a USB on the computer it is used with.

Call-in dictation system 
Call in dictation systems allow one to record their dictations over the phone. With call in dictation systems, the author dials a phone number, enters a PIN and starts dictating. Touch tone controls allow for start, pause, playback, and sending of dictation audio file.  The call in dictation systems usually feature a Pod that can be plugged into a phone line. The pod can then be plugged into a computer to store dictation audio recording in compatible transcription or management software.

Mobile phone
Currently there are several digital dictation applications available for mobile phones.  With mobile dictation apps, one can record, edit, and send dictation files over networks.  Wireless transfer of dictation files decreases turnaround time. Mobile dictation applications allow users to stay connected to dictation workflows through a network, such as the Internet.

Software
There are two types of digital dictation software:
Standalone digital sound recording software: Basic software whereby the audio is recorded as a simple file. Most digital sound recording applications are designed for individuals or a very small number of users, as they do not offer a network efficient way of transferring the audio files other than email, they also do not encrypt or password protect the audio file
Digital dictation workflow software: Advanced software for commercial organizations where audio is still played by a typist but the audio file can be securely and efficiently transferred. The workflow element of these advanced systems also allows users to share audio files instantly, create virtual teams, outsource transcription securely, and set up confidential send options or 'ethical walls'. Digital Dictation workflow software is normally Active Directory integrated and can be used in conjunction with document, practice or case management systems. Typical businesses using workflow software are law firms, healthcare organizations, accountancies or surveying firms.

Recordings can be made over the telephone, on a computer or via a hand held dictation device that is "docked" to a computer.

Transcription
Digital dictation is different from speech recognition where audio is analyzed by a computer using speech algorithms in an attempt to transcribe the document. With digital dictation the process of converting digital audio to text may be done using digital transcription software, typically controlled by a foot switch which allows the transcriber to PLAY, STOP, REWIND, and BACKSPACE. Nevertheless, there are Digital Transcription Kits that allow integration with Speech Recognition Software. This gives the typist the option to either type a document manually, or send a document to be converted to text by Software such as Dragon NaturallySpeaking.

Common dictation formats 
 Phonograph cylinder (1890s)
 Gray Audograph (1945)
 SoundScriber (1945)
 Edison Voicewriter (late 1940s)
 Dictabelt (1947)
 Compact Cassette (1963)
 Mini-Cassette (1967)
 Microcassette (1969)
 Digital dictation (1990s)

See also 
 Digital pen
 IBM dictation machines
 Speech recognition
 Volta Laboratory and Bureau

References 

Audiovisual introductions in 1886
Sound recording technology
Audio storage
Office equipment
Alexander Graham Bell
Transcription (linguistics)